Scandal Street is a 1925 American silent drama film directed by Whitman Bennett and starring Niles Welch, Madge Kennedy, and Edwin August.

Premise
When a film star is killed in a car crash during the shooting of his latest pictures, the producers replace him with a near identical man and try to pretend he is still alive.

Cast
 Niles Welch as Neil Keenly / Harrison Halliday 
 Madge Kennedy as Sheila Kane 
 Edwin August as Howard Manning 
 Coit Albertson as Julian Lewis 
 Louise Carter as Cora Forman 
 J. Moy Bennett as Pat O'Malley

References

Bibliography
 Munden, Kenneth White. The American Film Institute Catalog of Motion Pictures Produced in the United States, Part 1. University of California Press, 1997.

External links

1925 films
1925 drama films
Silent American drama films
Films directed by Whitman Bennett
American silent feature films
1920s English-language films
American black-and-white films
Films about filmmaking
Arrow Film Corporation films
1920s American films